The 1999–2000 Segunda Divisão de Honra season was the tenth season of the competition and the 66th season of recognised second-tier football in Portugal.

Overview
The league was contested by 18 teams with FC Paços de Ferreira winning the championship and gaining promotion to the Primeira Liga along with SC Beira-Mar and CD Aves. At the other end of the table Moreirense FC, AD Esposende and SC Covilhã were relegated to the Segunda Divisão.

League standings

Footnotes

External links
 Portugal 1999/2000 - RSSSF (Jorge Santos, Jan Schoenmakers and Daniel Dalence)
 Portuguese II Liga 1999/2000 - footballzz.co.uk

Liga Portugal 2 seasons
Port
2